The following outline is provided as an overview of and introduction to Belize:

Belize – country located on the north eastern coast of Central America and the only country in the area where English is the official language, although Kriol and Spanish are more commonly spoken. Belize has a diverse society, comprising many cultures and languages and it is the only nation in the region with a British colonial heritage but as a part of the Western Caribbean Zone, it also shares a common heritage with the Caribbean portions of other Central American countries.

General reference

 Pronunciation: 
 Common name in English: Belize (etymology)
 Official name in English: Belize
 Common endonym(s): Belize
 Official endonym(s): Belize
 Demonym(s): Belizean
 International rankings
 ISO country codes: BZ, BLZ, 084
 ISO region codes: see ISO 3166-2:BZ
 Internet country code top-level domain: .bz

Geography of Belize 

Geography of Belize
 Belize is...
 a country
 a nation state
 a Commonwealth realm
 Location:
 Northern Hemisphere and Western Hemisphere
 Americas
 North America
 Middle America
 Central America
 Western Caribbean Zone
 Time zone: Central Standard Time (UTC-06)
 Extreme points of Belize
 High: Doyle's Delight 
 Low: Caribbean Sea 0 m
 Land boundaries: 516 km
 266 km
 250 km
 Coastline: 386 km
 Population of Belize: 301,270(2008) - 174th most populous country

 Area of Belize:  - 150th largest country
 Atlas of Belize

Environment of Belize 

 Climate of Belize
 Environmental issues in Belize
 Geology of Belize
 Protected areas of Belize
 Biosphere reserves in Belize
 National parks of Belize
 Renewable energy in Belize
 Wildlife of Belize
 Fauna of Belize
 Birds of Belize
 Mammals of Belize
 Flora of Belize

Natural geographic features of Belize 

 Atoll
 Barrier reef
 Fjords of Belize
 Glaciers of Belize
 Islands of Belize
 Lakes of Belize
 Mountains of Belize
 Volcanoes in Belize
 Rivers of Belize
 Waterfalls of Belize
 Submarine sinkhole
 Valleys of Belize
 World Heritage Sites in Belize

Regions of Belize 
Regions of Belize

Ecoregions of Belize 

List of ecoregions in Belize

Administrative divisions of Belize 

Administrative divisions of Belize
 Districts of Belize
 Constituencies of Belize

Districts of Belize 

Districts of Belize
Belize
Cayo
Corozal
Orange Walk
Stann Creek
Toledo

Constituencies of Belize
The constituencies of Belize by District:
Belize District:
Albert
Belize Rural Central
Belize Rural North
Belize Rural South
Caribbean Shores
Collet
Fort George
Freetown
Lake Independence
Mesopotamia
Pickstock
Port Loyola
Queen's Square
Cayo District
Belmopan
Cayo Central
Cayo North
Cayo North East
Cayo South
Cayo West
Corozal District
Corozal Bay
Corozal North
Corozal South East
Corozal South West
Orange Walk District
Orange Walk Central
Orange Walk East
Orange Walk North
Orange Walk South
Stann Creek District
Dangriga
Stann Creek West
Toledo District
Toledo East
Toledo West

Municipalities of Belize
Capital: Belmopan
Cities: Cities of Belize

Demography of Belize 
Demographics of Belize

Government and politics of Belize 
Politics of Belize
 Capital of Belize: Belmopan
 Elections in Belize
 Form of government: parliamentary representative democratic monarchy
 Political parties in Belize

Branches of government

Government of Belize

Executive branch of the government of Belize 
 Cabinet of Belize
 Head of government: Prime Minister of Belize, Johnny Briceño
 Head of state: Monarch of Belize, Charles III
 His Majesty's representative: Governor-General of Belize, Froyla Tzalam

Legislative branch of the government of Belize 
 National Assembly of Belize (bicameral)
 Upper house: Senate of Belize
 Lower house: House of Representatives of Belize

Judicial branch of the government of Belize 

Court system of Belize
 Judicial Committee of the Privy Council
 Supreme Court of Belize
 Magistrates' Court of Belize

Foreign relations of Belize 

Foreign relations of Belize
 Diplomatic missions in Belize
 Diplomatic missions of Belize

International organization membership 
Belize is a member of:

African, Caribbean, and Pacific Group of States (ACP)
Agency for the Prohibition of Nuclear Weapons in Latin America and the Caribbean (OPANAL)
Caribbean Community and Common Market (Caricom)
Caribbean Development Bank (CDB)
Central American Integration System (SICA)
Commonwealth of Nations
Food and Agriculture Organization (FAO)
Group of 77 (G77)
Inter-American Development Bank (IADB)
International Atomic Energy Agency (IAEA)
International Bank for Reconstruction and Development (IBRD)
International Civil Aviation Organization (ICAO)
International Criminal Court (ICCt)
International Criminal Police Organization (Interpol)
International Development Association (IDA)
International Federation of Red Cross and Red Crescent Societies (IFRCS)
International Finance Corporation (IFC)
International Fund for Agricultural Development (IFAD)
International Labour Organization (ILO)
International Maritime Organization (IMO)
International Monetary Fund (IMF)
International Olympic Committee (IOC)
International Organization for Migration (IOM)

International Red Cross and Red Crescent Movement (ICRM)
International Telecommunication Union (ITU)
International Trade Union Confederation (ITUC)
Latin American Economic System (LAES)
Multilateral Investment Guarantee Agency (MIGA)
Nonaligned Movement (NAM)
Organisation for the Prohibition of Chemical Weapons (OPCW)
Organization of American States (OAS)
Permanent Court of Arbitration (PCA)
Rio Group (RG)
United Nations (UN)
United Nations Conference on Trade and Development (UNCTAD)
United Nations Educational, Scientific, and Cultural Organization (UNESCO)
United Nations Industrial Development Organization (UNIDO)
Universal Postal Union (UPU)
World Confederation of Labour (WCL)
World Customs Organization (WCO)
World Federation of Trade Unions (WFTU)
World Health Organization (WHO)
World Intellectual Property Organization (WIPO)
World Meteorological Organization (WMO)
World Trade Organization (WTO)

Law and order in Belize 
Law of Belize
 Constitution of Belize
 Crime in Belize
 Human rights in Belize
 Freedom of religion in Belize
 LGBT rights in Belize
 Law enforcement in Belize

Military of Belize 
Military of Belize
 Command
 Commander-in-chief
 Ministry of Defence of Belize
 Forces
 Air Force of Belize
 Army of Belize
 Navy of Belize
 Special forces of Belize
 Military history of Belize
 Military ranks of Belize

Local government in Belize 

Local government in Belize

History of Belize 

History of Belize
Current events of Belize
 Military history of Belize
Timeline of the history of Belize

Culture of Belize 

Culture of Belize
 Architecture of Belize
 Cuisine of Belize
 Festivals in Belize
 Languages of Belize
 Media in Belize
 Newspapers
 Radio stations
 Television stations
 National symbols of Belize
 Coat of arms of Belize
 Flag of Belize
 National Anthem: "Land of the Free"
 People of Belize
 Belizean Creole people
 Prostitution in Belize
 Public holidays in Belize
 Records of Belize
 Religion in Belize
 Buddhism in Belize
 Christianity in Belize
 Catholic Church in Belize
 Hinduism in Belize
 Islam in Belize
 Judaism in Belize
 Sikhism in Belize
 World Heritage Sites in Belize

Art in Belize 
 Art in Belize
 Cinema of Belize
 Literature of Belize
 Music of Belize
 Theatre in Belize

Sports in Belize 
Sports in Belize
 Belize at the Olympics
 Football in Belize

Economy and infrastructure of Belize

Economy of Belize
 Belize Stock Exchange
 Central Bank of Belize 
 Communications in Belize
 Internet in Belize
 Companies of Belize
Currency of Belize: Dollar
ISO 4217: BZD
 Economic rank, by nominal GDP (2007): 163rd (one hundred and sixty third)
 Energy in Belize
 Tourism in Belize
 Visa policy of Belize
 Transport in Belize
 Airports in Belize
 Ports of Belize
 Rail transport in Belize
 Roads in Belize

Education in Belize 
Education in Belize
 University of Belize

Health 
Healthcare in Belize

See also

Belize

 
Index of Belize-related articles
List of Belize-related topics
List of international rankings
Member state of the Commonwealth of Nations
Member state of the United Nations
Outline of Central America
Outline of geography
Outline of North America

References

External links

Belize information on globalEDGE
Belize National Emergency Management Organization - Official governmental site
Belize Tourism Board - Official Tourism site
Belize. The World Factbook. Central Intelligence Agency.
Encyclopædia Britannica Belize's Country Page
Government of Belize - Official governmental site

Belize